Max von Moos (1903–1979) was a Swiss painter.

References
This article was initially translated from the German Wikipedia.

1903 births
1979 deaths
20th-century Swiss painters
Swiss male painters
20th-century Swiss male artists